Hillsborough is a civil parish in eastern Albert County, New Brunswick, Canada. It comprises one village and one local service district, both of which are members of the Southeast Regional Service Commission.

The Census subdivision of the same name includes all of the parish except the village of Hillsborough.

Origin of name
Hillsborough was probably named in honour of the Earl of Hillsborough, First Lord of Trade in 1765.

History
Hillsborough was originally established in 1765 as a township within Nova Scotia, a grant of 100 000 acres to Robert Cummings and four others that included modern Hillsborough Parish and most of Coverdale Parish. In 1786 the township's boundaries were explicitly used for the newly erected Hillsborough Parish.

Boundaries
Hillsborough Parish is bounded:
on the north by the northern line of a grant to Albert E. Rogers on the Petitcodiac River, about 120 metres south of the mouth of Stoney Creek, and its prolongation inland to a point about 2.6 kilometres east of Little River;
on the east by the Petitcodiac River;
on the west by a line running north 22º west to the prolongation of the Rogers grant.

Evolution of boundaries
Originally the western line of Hillsborough extended north to the Petitcodiac River west of Upper Coverdale.

In 1828 all of the parish north of a line running west from the mouth of Stoney Creek was erected as Coverdale Parish.

The northern boundary was moved slightly south in 1850 to its modern starting point. 1850 was also the first year the parish's southern and western boundaries were described without referring to the original boundaries of the pre-Loyalist township.

Municipality
The village of Hillsborough is on the Petitcodiac River, from south of Weldon Creek to north of Christopher Lane; the inland boundary is irregular, based partly on grant lines and partly on property lines of the late 1960s.

Local service district
The local service district of the parish of Hillsborough includes the entire parish outside the village of Hillsborough.

The LSD was established on 23 November 1966 to assess for fire protection following the abolition of rural governments by the new Municipalities Act. First aid & ambulance services were added on 17 November 1976.

Today the LSD assesses for community & recreation services in addition to the basic LSD services of fire protection, police services, land use planning, emergency measures, and dog control. The taxing authority is 615.00 Hillsborough.

Communities
Communities at least partly within the parish; bold indicates an incorporated municipality

Albert Mines
Baltimore
Beech Hill
Berryton
Caledonia Mountain
Dawson Settlement
Demoiselle Creek
Edgetts Landing
Hillsborough
Surrey
Isaiah Corner
Osborne Corner
Rosevale
Salem
Shenstone
Steeves Mills
Steevescote
Weldon

Bodies of water
Bodies of water at least partly in the parish:
Petitcodiac River
Stoney Creek
Turtle Creek - East Branch, West Branch
at least seven other named creeks
Stanyard Lake

Islands
Islands at least partly in the parish:
 Grays Island

Other notable places
Parks, historic sites, and other noteworthy places at least partly in the parish.
 Big Meadows Protected Natural Area
 Caledonia Gorge Protected Natural Area
 Lewis Mountain Protected Natural Area
 Wilson Brook Protected Natural Area

Demographics

Population
Parish population total does not include the village of Hillsborough

Language
Mother tongue (2016)

Access Routes
Highways and numbered routes that run through the parish, including external routes that start or finish at the parish limits:

Highways

Principal Routes
None

Secondary Routes:

External Routes:
None

Notes

References

Parishes of Albert County, New Brunswick
Local service districts of Albert County, New Brunswick